BakKART (Azerbaijani: "BakKART") is an electronic single payment card designed to meet the demands of passengers in public transportation in Baku, Azerbaijan, beginning in August 2015. Baku Metro and BakuBus lines are initially operated by the BakKART system.

History 
Until March 1, 2006, Baku Metro accepted tokens as payment for metro rides. In 2007, only RFID cards called "Metro Cards" were used to pay for subway rides. The Metro Card, which cost $2, was only available to pay for Baku Metro. On August 8, 2015, the Metro Card was replaced by BakKART. During this time, Metro Card balances and initial values could be transferred to BakKART. This card was designed to assist citizens in adapting to the change.

Overview 
BakıKART is applied to pay the subway and bus fare on BakuBus lines. Two types of cards are used in a single system:
BakıKART (Plastic card).  
BakıKART with limited access (Paper card). Valid 45 days. 
Both cards can be purchased at BakuCard terminals at Baku Metro stations, press kiosks, bus stops and other points with the BakıKART logo. BakıKART balance can be replenished using 10, 20, and 50 gapik coins, and 1, 5, 10, 20, 50, and 100 manat banknotes at terminals.

BakıKART Plastic Card 
A card costsis non-refundable. Bus fares vary based on distance, according to Decision #7 of the Tariff Council of the Republic of Azerbaijan (30 July 2018).

At terminals, plastic cards can be refilled. They are recommended for passengers who use public transportation on a regular basis.

BakıKART Paper card 
A card costs $0.30 and is non-refundable. Paper cards cannot be refilled at terminals and are only available in increments of one, two, three, or four passes. These cards are intended for Baku City visitors and residents who rarely use public transportation.

See also 
 List of cities in Azerbaijan
 Transport in Azerbaijan
 Baku Metro
 List of Baku Metro stations
 BakuBus

External links 
 Official website of BakıKart
 Official website of Baku Metropolitan
 Official website of BakuBus
 Official website of Baku Transport Agency

References 

Public transport in Azerbaijan
Baku Metro stations
Fare collection systems